Argies, is a band from Argentina of punk rock, reggae, dub and ska, formed in Rosario, Santa Fe; in 1984. The name "Argies" is the pejorative apocope for "argentine", expression extensively used by the British soldiers during the war in Falkland in 1982. Even though their musical root is the British punk from the seventies, the band's lyrics have a testimonial style and, nowadays, turning to a deeper search into the inside of human ethic.

Unlike most bands, which have fixed members, Argies works as a cooperative of independent musicians. Each member that comes into the band plays until their personal and free decision to leave, helping to create a cultural movement across the years. Performances in 45 countries: With many shows in Argentina, Argies also has played 1211 shows in Europe, 74 shows in Latin America and 43 shows in Asia (included 14 shows in China) between 1996 and 2022.

The band has changed their formation, however, its founder and singer, David Balbina, remains its most visible face since its foundation.

Discography 
 1996: Historias y corridas
 1998: A media asta
 2001: La Frontera
 2002: Great Combat Performances
 2003: Himnos de combate
 2003: Fake Reaction
 2005: Al límite de las utopías
 2007: Lista Negra, historia de Argies
 2008: Quien despierta
 2010: Click Off
 2012: Don´t cry for me best of... in English
 2013: Bailando en mis Zapatos
 2014: 30 años en las Trincheras
 2015: Siempre alerta - live
 2016: Prost, Nazdrowie, Cheers
 2019: Vida cara
 2020: Volviéndose Ska
 2021: Global Live - live
 2022: Reset

See also 
Argentine punk

References

External links 

Argentine rock music groups
Argentine punk rock groups
Musical groups established in 1984
Musical quartets